Güneş Taner (born November 14, 1949) is a Turkish politician and former government minister.

Early life
Güneş Taner was born in Istanbul to Cengiz Tahir Taner and his wife Süheyla on November 14, 1949.

He was educated in civil engineering at Yıldız Technical University, and literature at Faculty of Letters in Istanbul University. He received a master's degree in Industrial administration from State University of New York Polytechnic Institute. He has an honorary doctor title awarded by Plekhanov Russian University of Economics.

Taner was an executive at Citibank.

Politics career
He served as politics advisor to the prime minister, and was among the founders of the Motherland Party (ANAP). He was elected to the parliament four times in 1987, 1991, 1995 and 1999 general elections representing Istanbul Province.

In 1990, Taner was appointed placeholder for the post of Minister of National Defense in the Yıldırım Akbulut cabinet, and was in office for a short term from October 19 to 28. In the cabinet of Mesut Yılmaz, he served as Minister of State responsible for Economy between June 30, 1997, and November 25, 1998.

Türkbank scandal and trial
Turkey's first private bank, the Türk Ticaret Banksaı, aka Türkbank, went under control of the Treasury in May 1994 following its weakening as a result of the Turkish financial crisis, which blew up in January the same year. The bank's majority stake were taken over by the Savings Deposit Insurance Fund of Turkey (TMSF) for sale in a public tender.

Self-made businessman Korkmaz Yiğit won the tender offering US$600 million. However, a recording tape containing a private conversation of him with the mob boss Alaattin Çakıcı about the tender became public, and caused a scandal. The scandal spread over to the politics when Yiğit gave in his testimony details about his connections with Prime Minister Mesut Yılmaz and Minister responsible for Economy Güneş Taner relating to the tender. Yiğit claimed that "Yılmaz and Taner encouraged him to buy Türkbank, and offered him loans from other state banks to ensure that his bid was the highest".

The tender was annulled, Çakıcı and Yiğit were arrested. The coalition cabinet led by Yılmaz fell down by a motion of no confidence on January 11, 1999. A parliamentary investigative report, which accused Yılmaz  and Güneş for conspiring to rig bids on tender, became obsolete due to nearing general election in 1999. After the general election in 2002, a new parliamentary investigation committee confirmed the accusations against both the politicians, and proposed to send them to the Constitutional Court of Turkey for trial. The supreme court concluded on June 23, 2006, that Yılmaz and Taner are guilty of bid rigging as per Turkish Penal Code's Article 765 Section 205. However, the sentences were reprieved in accordance with applicable laws.

References

|-

1949 births
Living people
Politicians from Istanbul
Yıldız Technical University alumni
Istanbul University alumni
SUNY Polytechnic Institute alumni
Motherland Party (Turkey) politicians
Deputies of Istanbul
Ministers of National Defence of Turkey
Ministers of Economic Affairs of Turkey
Turkish politicians convicted of corruption
Members of the 21st Parliament of Turkey
Members of the 20th Parliament of Turkey
Members of the 47th government of Turkey
Members of the 55th government of Turkey
Ministers of State of Turkey